Sigmund Freud was an influential physician and founder of psychoanalysis who treated patients with psychiatric disorders. His views on homosexuality ascribed biological and psychological factors to explain the principal causes of homosexuality. Sigmund Freud believed that humans are born with unfocused sexual libidinal drives, and therefore argued that homosexuality might be a deviation from said sexual drive.

Overview
Freud's most important articles on homosexuality were written between 1905, when he published Three Essays on the Theory of Sexuality, and 1922, when he published "Certain Neurotic Mechanisms in Jealousy, Paranoia, and Homosexuality". Freud believed that all humans were bisexual, by which he primarily meant that everyone incorporates aspects of both sexes, and that everyone is sexually attracted to both sexes. In his view, this was true anatomically and therefore also mentally and psychologically. Heterosexuality and homosexuality both developed from this original bisexual disposition. As one of the causes of homosexuality, Freud mentions the distressing heterosexual experience: "Those cases are of particular interest in which the libido changes over to an inverted sexual object after a distressing experience with a normal one."

Freud appears to have been undecided whether or not homosexuality was pathological, expressing different views on this issue at different times and places in his work. Freud frequently borrowed the term "inversion" from his contemporaries to describe homosexuality, something which in his view was distinct from the necessarily pathological perversions, and suggested that several distinct kinds might exist, cautioning that his conclusions about it were based on a small and not necessarily representative sample of patients.

Freud derived much of his information on homosexuality from psychiatrists and sexologists such as Richard von Krafft-Ebing and Magnus Hirschfeld, and was also influenced by Eugen Steinach, a Viennese endocrinologist who transplanted testicles from straight men into gay men in attempts to change their sexual orientation. Freud stated that Steinach's research had "thrown a strong light on the organic determinants of homoeroticism", but cautioned that it was premature to expect that the operations he performed would make possible a therapy that could be generally applied. In his view, such transplant operations would be effective in changing sexual orientation only in cases in which homosexuality was strongly associated with physical characteristics typical of the opposite sex, and probably no similar therapy could be applied to lesbianism. In fact Steinach's method was doomed to failure because the immune systems of his patients rejected the transplanted glands, and was eventually exposed as ineffective and often harmful.

Views on attempts to change homosexuality
Freud believed that homosexuals could seldom be convinced that sex with someone of the opposite sex would provide them with the same pleasure they derived from sex with someone of the same sex. Patients often pursued treatment due to social disapproval, which was not a strong enough motive for change.

Freud wrote in the 1920 paper The Psychogenesis of a Case of Homosexuality in a Woman, that changing homosexuality was difficult and therefore possible only under unusually favourable conditions, observing that "in general to undertake to convert a fully developed homosexual into a heterosexual does not offer much more prospect of success than the reverse." Success meant making heterosexual feelings possible rather than eliminating homosexual feelings.

Female homosexuality
Freud's main discussion of female homosexuality was the paper The Psychogenesis of a Case of Homosexuality in a Woman, which described his analysis of a young woman who had entered therapy because her parents were concerned that she was a lesbian. Her father hoped that psychoanalysis would cure her lesbianism, but in Freud's view, the prognosis was unfavourable because of the circumstances under which the woman entered therapy, and because the homosexuality was not an illness or neurotic conflict. 

Freud, therefore, told the parents only that he was prepared to study their daughter to determine what effects therapy might have. Freud concluded that he was probably dealing with a case of biologically innate homosexuality, and eventually broke off the treatment because of what he saw as his patient's hostility to men.

1935 letter
In 1935, Freud wrote to a mother who had asked him to treat her son's homosexuality, a letter that would later become famous:

See also

 Conversion therapy
 Homosexuality and psychology
 Sexual Preference

Notes

References
  Hand-written letter.

Sigmund Freud's views
Freudian psychology
Conversion therapy
Freud, Sigmund
Point of view